Alex Rae may refer to:

Alex Rae (American soccer), American soccer player (Newark Germans, Kearny Scots, United States)
Alex Rae (footballer, born 1946), Scottish football player (East Fife, Partick Thistle, Forfar)
Alex Rae (footballer, born 1969), former Scottish football player and manager (Falkirk, Millwall, Sunderland, Wolves and Rangers; Dundee and St Mirren manager)
Alex Rae (rugby union) (born 1986), English rugby union player (Northampton, Bedford)